The 2015 Archery World Cup is the 10th edition of the annual international archery circuit, organised by the World Archery Federation.

Competition rules and scoring
The compound legs consisted of a 50m qualification round of 72 arrows, followed by the compound round at 50m on a 6-zone target face, using cumulative scoring for all individual, team and mixed competitions. The top seven individual performers (with no more than two from each country,) plus one host nation representative if not already qualified, proceeded to the finals; the top mixed team performer proceeded to face the host nation at the finals, which were the same competition format as the legs. The team competition was not competed at the finals.

The recurve legs consisted of a 1440 qualification round (formerly called a FITA round), followed by a 72m Olympic set system. The top seven individual performers (with no more than two from each country), plus one host nation representative if not already qualified, proceeded to the finals; the top mixed team performer proceeded to face the host nation at the finals, which were the same competition format as the legs. The team competition was not competed at the finals.

The scores awarded in the four stages were as follows:

Individual scoring

Mixed team scoring

Calendar

Results

Recurve

Men's individual

Women's individual

Men's team

Women's team

Mixed team

Compound

Men's individual

Women's individual

Men's team

Women's team

Mixed team

Medals table

References

External links
 Competition format 
 Competition rules 

Archery World Cup
World
Archery
Archery
Archery
Archery
Archery
International archery competitions hosted by China
International archery competitions hosted by Turkey
International archery competitions hosted by Colombia
International archery competitions hosted by Mexico
International archery competitions hosted by Poland
Sports competitions in Shanghai
Sport in Antalya
21st century in Antalya
Sport in Wrocław
Sport in Medellín
Sports competitions in Mexico City
2010s in Mexico City